is a pedestrian bridge officially known as the  that spans a valley on the southwestern rim of the Mount Hakone caldera in Mishima, Shizuoka, Japan. The primary function of the bridge is to provide visitors with panoramic views of Mount Fuji and Suruga Bay.

References

External links
 
 Mishima Skywalk

Bridges in Japan
Bridges completed in 2015
Footbridges
Toll bridges in Japan